The Horizon Air Summer Series was a unique 11-week baseball competition among collegiate summer baseball clubs.

History
The Summer Series was founded in 2005 by Bob Bavasi, former owner of the Everett Aqua Sox, of the Northwest League. It is sponsored by Alaska Airlines' sister company, Horizon Air. It is hosted by the Marysville Gold Sox of Marysville, California.

Among other leagues, teams from the Alaska Baseball League, West Coast League, Pacific International League, Southern California Collegiate Baseball Association, Sierra Baseball League, and California Collegiate League have competed in the series.

The series was originally made up of two divisions: The 40-game "McCullough Division" and the 20-game "Engelken Division". In 2008 the series was expanded with the addition of a third division, the "Bavasi Division", named after the series founder's father and former Brooklyn Dodger and Los Angeles Dodger General Manager Emil "Buzzie" Bavasi.

The Horizon Air Summer Series ceased after the 2013 season.  It has since been replaced by the Sierra Central/Montna Farms Summer Series (now known as just the Montna Farms Summer Series, again hosted by the Gold Sox.

Divisions & teams
The series teams are divided up into three divisions.

Don McCullough Division (40 games)
 Atwater Aviators
 Humboldt Crabs
  Marysville Gold Sox
 Neptune Beach Pearl
 Redding Colt .45s
 Seattle Studs

Gary Engelken Division (24 games)
 California Glory
 Menlo Park Legends
 Nevada Bighorns
 San Francisco Seagulls
 South Bay Storm
 Walnut Creek Crawdads

Buzzie Bavasi Division (24 games)
 Auburn Wildcats
 Sacramento Legends
 Sacramento Spikes
 San Mateo Rounders
 Solano Mudcats

Champions
2005: Solano Thunderbirds
2006: Yuba-Sutter Gold Sox
2007: Humboldt Crabs & Corvallis Knights (tied)
2008: Seattle Studs
2009: Seattle Studs
2010: Seattle Studs
2011: Marysville Gold Sox
2012: Seattle Studs
2013: Humboldt Crabs

Notable alumni

Anthony Bass
Dallas Braden
Matt Garza
Bud Norris
Scott Feldman
Toby Gerhart
Tommy Everidge
Tommy Hanson
Kevin Frandsen
 Curtis Partch
Max Stassi

References

External links
 Horizon Air Summer Series official website
 Marysville Gold Sox official website

 
College baseball leagues in the United States
2005 establishments in California
Sports leagues established in 2005